The 1917 Inverness-shire by-election was a parliamentary by-election held for the House of Commons constituency of Inverness-shire in the Scottish Highlands on 2 January 1917.

Vacancy
The by-election was caused by the elevation to the peerage of the sitting Liberal MP, John Dewar. Dewar had held the seat since 1900 and had been unopposed at the previous election in December 1910.

Candidates

The Inverness-shire Liberals adopted Thomas Brash Morison KC as their new candidate. Morison was a barrister who had been serving as Solicitor General for Scotland since 1913.

There was at this time no tradition of candidates from organised labour contesting Parliamentary elections in this constituency. No nominations were received from the Conservatives who were partners in the wartime Coalition and were presumably content to honour the wartime electoral truce. Morison was therefore returned unopposed.

The result

See also
Lists of United Kingdom by-elections 
United Kingdom by-election records

References 

Unopposed by-elections to the Parliament of the United Kingdom in Scottish constituencies
Politics of the county of Inverness
Inverness-shire by-election
Inverness-shire by-election
1910s elections in Scotland
Inverness-shire by-election